The 1947 South American Championship was the 20th South American Championship for national teams, and was organized by CONMEBOL. It marked the first time Ecuador hosted the tournament, which hosted all the matches in Estadio George Capwell in Guayaquil. Argentina won the tournament to obtain their ninth South American title.

Brazil withdrew from the tournament.

Format
Each team played the teams in a single round-robin tournament, earning two points for a win, one point for a draw, and zero points for a loss. The team with the most points at the end of the tournament will be crowned the champions.

Squads
For a complete list of participating squads see: 1947 South American Championship squads

Venues

Final round

Result

Goal scorers

8 Goals
  Nicolás Falero

6 Goals

  Alfredo Di Stéfano
  Norberto Méndez
  Leocardio Marín

5 Goals
  Juan B. Villalba

4 Goals

  Mario Boyé
  Félix Loustau
  René Pontoni
  Alejandrino Genés
  Héctor Magliano

3 Goals

  Moreno
  Pedro H. López
  Osvaldo Sáez
  Carlos Gómez Sánchez
  Luis Guzmán
  Julio César Britos

2 Goals

  Benigno Gutiérrez
  Fernando Riera
  José M. Jiménez
  Valeriano López
  Máximo Mosquera
  Washington Puente
  Raúl Sarro

1 Goal

  Mario Fernández
  Zenón González
  Severo Orgaz
  Armando Tapia
  Arturo Tardío
  Miguel Busquets
  Raimundo Infante
  Jorge Peñaloza
  Andrés Prieto
  Carlos Varela
  Carlos Arango
  Rafael Granados
  César Garnica
  Enrique Ávalos
  Félix Castillo
  Juan Castillo
  Schubert Gambetta
  José García

Own Goal
  Duberty Aráoz (for Chile)

External links
 South American Championship 1947 at RSSSF

 
1947
International association football competitions hosted by Ecuador
South
South
November 1947 sports events in South America
December 1947 sports events in South America
Sports competitions in Guayaquil
20th century in Guayaquil